Fire arrows were one of the earliest forms of weaponized gunpowder, being used from the 9th century onward. Not to be confused with earlier incendiary arrow projectiles, the fire arrow was a gunpowder weapon which receives its name from the translated Chinese term huǒjiàn (火箭), which literally means fire arrow. In China a 'fire arrow' referred to a gunpowder projectile consisting of a bag of incendiary gunpowder attached to the shaft of an arrow. Fire arrows are the predecessors of fire lances, the first firearm.

Later rockets utilizing gunpowder were used to provide arrows with propulsive force and the term fire arrow became synonymous with rockets in the Chinese language. In other languages such as Sanskrit 'fire arrow' (agni astra) underwent a different semantic shift and became synonymous with 'cannon'.

Design
Although the fire arrow is most commonly associated with its rocket mechanism, it originally consisted of a pouch of gunpowder attached to an arrow. This type of fire arrow served the function of an incendiary and was launched using a bow or crossbow.

According to the Wujing Zongyao the fire arrow was constructed and used in the following manner:

Incendiary gunpowder weapons had an advantage over previous incendiaries by using their own built-in oxygen supply to create flames, and were therefore harder to put out, similar to Greek fire. However unlike Greek fire, gunpowder's physical properties are solid rather than liquid, which makes it easier to store and load.

The rocket propelled fire arrow appeared later. By the mid 1300s rocket arrow launchers had appeared in the Ming dynasty and later on mobile rocket arrow launchers were utilized in China and later spread to Korea. The fire arrows propelled by gunpowder may have had a range of up to 1,000 feet.

History

The fire arrows were first reported to have been used by the Southern Wu in 904 during the siege of Yuzhang.

In 969 gunpowder propelled rocket arrows were invented by Yue Yifang and Feng Jisheng.

In 975, the state of Wuyue sent to the Song dynasty a unit of soldiers skilled in the handling of fire arrows. In the same year, the Song used fire arrows to destroy the fleet of Southern Tang.

In 994, the Liao dynasty attacked the Song and laid siege to Zitong with 100,000 troops. They were repelled with the aid of fire arrows.

Published in 1044, the Wujing Zongyao, or Complete Compendium of Military Classics, states that in 994 A.D. the city of Zitong was attacked by an army of 100,000 men who were driven back by regular war machines and fire arrows.

In 1076 Vietnam's Lý dynasty used fire arrows against the Song army and razed three Chinese cities.

In 1083 Song records state that the court produced 350,000 fire arrows and sent them to two garrisons.

On March 1, 1126, the Song general Li Gang used a fire arrow machine known as the Thunderbolt thrower during the Jingkang Incident.

By 1127 the Jin were also using fire arrows produced by captured Song artisans.

In 1159 fire arrows were used by the Song navy in sinking a Jin fleet.

In 1161 the general Yu Yunwen used fire arrows at the Battle of Caishi, near present-day Ma'anshan, during a Jin maritime incursion.

By 1206, "gunpowder arrows" (huoyaojian) rather than just "fire arrows" (huojian) were mentioned.

In 1245, a military exercise was conducted on the Qiantang River using what were probably rockets.

The Mongols also made use of the fire arrow during their campaigns in Japan. Probably as a result of the Mongolian military campaigns the fire arrows later spread into the Middle East, where they were mentioned by Al Hasan Al Ramma in the late 13th century.

In 1374 the kingdom of Joseon also started producing gunpowder and by 1377 was producing cannons and fire arrows, which they used against wokou pirates. Korean fire arrows were used against the Japanese during the invasion of Korea in 1592.

In 1380 an order of "wasp nest" rocket arrow launchers were ordered by the Ming army and in 1400 rocket arrow launchers were recorded to have been used by Li Jinglong.

In 1451 a type of mobile rocket arrow launcher known as the "Munjong Hwacha" was invented in Joseon.

The Japanese version of the fire arrow was known as the bo hiya. The Japanese pirates (wokou, also known as wako or kaizoku) in the 16th century were reported to have used the bo hiya which had the appearance of a large arrow. A burning element made from incendiary waterproof rope was wrapped around the shaft and when lit the bo hiya was launched from a mortar like weapon hiya taihou or a wide bore Tanegashima matchlock arquebus. During one sea battle it was said the bo hiya were "falling like rain".

Rocket invention
The dating of the appearance of the gunpowder propelled fire arrow, otherwise known as a rocket, more specifically a solid-propellant rocket, is disputed. The History of Song attributes the invention to two different people at different times, Feng Jisheng in 969 and Tang Fu in 1000. However Joseph Needham argues that rockets could not have existed prior to the 12th century since the gunpowder formulas listed in the Wujing Zongyao are not suitable as rocket propellant. According to Stephen G. Haw, there is only slight evidence that rockets existed prior to 1200 and it is more likely they were not produced or used for warfare until the latter half of the 13th century.

Gallery

See also

 Gunpowder
 Cannon
 Huo Che
 Hwacha
 Thai Isan Rocket Festival
 Jiao Yu
 Technology of the Song Dynasty
 Tracer ammo
 Science and technology in China

References

Bibliography
 .
 .
 
 
 
 Lu Zhen. "Alternative Twenty-Five Histories: Records of Nine Kingdoms". Jinan: Qilu Press, 2000. .
 .

External links
 Great Chinese Encyclopedia - Ancient Chinese Rocket
 http://inventors.about.com/library/inventors/blrockethistory.htm
 
 http://www.spaceline.org/history/1.html
 Chinese Fire Arrows

Gunpowder
Rocket artillery
Early rocketry
Early firearms
Arrow types
Chinese inventions
Artillery of China